Voy Pa' Encima (I'm going for it) is the second studio album by Frankie Ruiz as a solo artist. The album became a success on the tropical charts just as the previous album did.

Singles
Two singles produced from the album charted on the Billboard Hot Latin Tracks.

Desnúdate Mujer (Get Naked Woman) was the first single released on the album peaking on #6. This was the first time that a salsa song would reached on the top ten on Hot Latin Tracks after its establishment in 1986.
Quiero Llenarte (I Want To Fill You) was the second single released from the album and peaked on #11 on Hot Latin Tracks.

Track listing
 Quiero Llenarte - 4:30
 Si No Te Hubieras Ido - 4:50
 Desnúdate Mujer - 4:48
 Mujeres - 4:06
 No Me Hables Mal de Ella - 4:58
 Impossible Amor - 4:57
 Quiero Verte - 4:28
 Voy Pa' Encima - 4:14

Chart position

Reception

José A. Estévez Jr. of Allmusic compared the Voy Pa' Encima to the previous album, Solista Pero No Solo, by calling the former "even more dynamic". Estévez praised the production from Julio Cesar Delgado from Rodven Records.

See also
List of number-one Billboard Tropical Albums from the 1980s

References

1987 albums
Frankie Ruiz albums
Rodven Records albums